The 1988 Race of Champions was the inaugural event and was held on December 4 at the Autodrome de Linas-Montlhéry near Paris, in memory of Henri Toivonen, who died while leading the 1986 Tour de Corse, and to celebrate the tenth anniversary of the world championship for rally drivers. This first event was the only Race of Champions event to feature a more conventional single-car rally stage format.

Participants

The inaugural cast included all the eight world rally champions from 1979 to 1988.

Race of Champions

Prologue 
All drivers used BMW M3 (E30)

First Qualification round 

 Cars
Ford Sierra RS Cosworth, plate D933 UOO (GBR), for Juha Kankkunen, Miki Biasion, Timo Salonen and Hannu Mikkola.

Ford Sierra RS Cosworth, plate D935 UOO (GBR), for Walter Röhrl, Stig Blomqvist*, Björn Waldegård and Ari Vatanen.
 Note: Stig Blomqvist used this car in Rally of the 1000 Lakes 1987, Lombard RAC Rally 1987, 1000 Lakes Rally 1988, Rallye Sanremo - Rallye d'Italia 1988 and Lombard RAC Rally 1988.

Starting order on stage: Juha Kankkunen, Walter Röhrl, Miki Biasion, Stig Blomqvist, Timo Salonen, Björn Waldegård, Hannu Mikkola and Ari Vatanen.

Second Qualification round 

 Cars
2 cars Opel Manta 400 with number plates OPEL MANTA.

Starting order on stage: Hannu Mikkola, Björn Waldegård, Walter Röhrl, Miki Biasion, Ari Vatanen, Juha Kankkunen, Timo Salonen   and Stig Blomqvist.

Qualification results 
Time includes first and second Qualification round

Semi-final 
 Cars
2 cars Audi Sport Quattro S1 E2 without number plates.
Starting order on stage: Walter Röhrl, Stig Blomqvist, Juha Kankkunen and Timo Salonen.

Final 

Starting order on stage: Juha Kankkunen, Timo Salonen

 Car 1
Peugeot 205 Turbo 16 E2, plate 290 FPF 75 (FRA)*, for both drivers
 Note: Peugeot 205 Turbo 16 E2 (but another chassis) with this number plate in Rallye Automobile de Monte-Carlo 1986 livery belongs to Juha Kankkunen and was demonstrated by him on Neste Rally Finland 2019 dates.

 Car 2
Lancia Delta Integrale, plate TO 89092H (ITA) (chassis #417880), for both drivers

Final results 
Time includes first and second heats

References

Race of Champions
Race of Champions
Race of champions
International sports competitions hosted by France
1988 in French sport